Aghan Singh Thakur was an Indian politician. He was elected to the Lok Sabha, lower house of the Parliament of India as a member of the Janata Party.

References

External links
Official biographical sketch in Parliament of India website

India MPs 1977–1979
Lok Sabha members from Madhya Pradesh
Janata Party politicians
1945 births
Living people